The 2014–15 NCAA Division III men's ice hockey season began on October 31, 2014, and concluded on March 28, 2015. This was the 42nd season of Division III college ice hockey.

Regular season

Season tournaments

Standings

Note: Mini-game are not included in final standings

2015 NCAA Tournament

See also
 2014–15 NCAA Division I men's ice hockey season
 2014–15 NCAA Division II men's ice hockey season

References

External links

 
NCAA